CKFM-FM (99.9 Virgin Radio) is a Canadian radio station, broadcasting on 99.9 MHz in Toronto, Ontario. The station is owned by Bell Media. The station airs a Top 40/CHR format, and is the flagship of Canada's "Virgin Radio" stations. CKFM's studios are located at 250 Richmond Street West in the Entertainment District, while its transmitter is located at the top of the CN Tower.

History

Early years

The station was launched in 1938 by the Rogers Radio Broadcasting Co. Ltd. (operated by Ted Rogers Sr., the father of the founder of Rogers Communications, as experimental FM station VE9AK. The station went off the air between 1942 and 1945 due to the war. It began broadcasting at 99.9 FM in 1947 as CFRB-FM, a simulcast of CFRB. Rogers Radio Broadcasting eventually became known as Standard Broadcasting, which was acquired by Argus Corporation in 1948.

In April 1961, the complete simulcast was dropped, in favour of some unique programming.

In April 1963, the station changed its call letters to CKFM-FM. All CFRB programming was discontinued. The station adopted an easy listening and MOR format, which lasted for many years and was very successful in ratings (a 1974 Billboard magazine article claimed the station had the most listeners in the 25-to-34-year-old age group of any Canadian radio station, AM or FM). During this time period, CKFM carried a few specialty shows, including a Sunday evening reggae program. Towards the latter part of the 1980s, CKFM transitioned towards a more younger-targeting adult contemporary format.

Mix/Mix FM (1991-2008)

The station adopted the brand name Mix 99.9, on September 2, 1991, and adopted a hot adult contemporary format to compete with CHUM-FM. The first song on "Mix" was "Changes" by David Bowie. The brand name was changed slightly to 99.9 Mix FM on August 8, 2006, and the branding was phased in throughout the day. This coincided with the return of former Kiss 92 and CHFI-FM morning show hosts Mad Dog and Billie to Toronto radio.

A Canadian Radio-television and Telecommunications Commission (CRTC) decision from May 31, 2007, stated that the station's call sign was changed to CFMX-FM. Within weeks, the station reverted to CKFM-FM, due to both potential confusion with CFMZ-FM as that station, licensed to Cobourg but also heard in Toronto because of a rebroadcaster, was previously known as CFMX-FM; and because as of November 14, 2007, according to Industry Canada databases, the Toronto rebroadcaster of CFMZ was actually still known as CFMX-FM-1 (not CFMZ-FM-1).

On October 28, 2007, CKFM was purchased by Astral Media as part of its purchase of Standard Broadcasting. Since its purchase by Astral, the hot AC format went in a more rhythmic-leaning direction, patterned after sister stations CJFM-FM in Montreal and CKZZ-FM in Vancouver, which both carried rhythmic-leaning hot AC formats. It also began airing the American Top 40, which usually airs on Top 40/CHR stations across the United States and Canada.

Virgin Radio (2008-present)

Astral announced a partnership with the Virgin Group to rebrand the station 99.9 Virgin Radio (pronounced, "nine-nine-nine Virgin Radio") on August 25, 2008, taking effect at 4 p.m. that day. The final song on "Mix" was Green Day's "Good Riddance (Time of Your Life)", while the first song on "Virgin" was Madonna's "Like a Virgin". The change came just before the original UK Virgin station was slated to lose its licence to the "Virgin" name and rebrand as Absolute Radio.

Astral officials indicated at the time that, if the rebranding was successful, the "Virgin" brand would eventually be rolled out to other markets nationwide. Barely three months later, on December 4, Astral deemed the new brand a success, and announced that stations in Montreal, Ottawa, and Vancouver will be rebranded as "Virgin" stations effective early January 2009. All three stations will retain essentially the same formats (rock at the Ottawa station, hot AC in Montreal and Vancouver). In addition to the aforementioned three stations, the "Virgin" branding has since been expanded to Calgary, Edmonton, London, Winnipeg, Kitchener, Halifax, Victoria, Kelowna and Windsor.

In June 2010, CKFM slightly changed its branding 99.9 Virgin Radio (pronounced, "ninety-nine-nine Virgin Radio"). A week after the change, the station held a contest called "Say it & Win!", where the 99th caller gets 10 seconds to say their new branding, "ninety-nine-nine Virgin Radio" for as many times as they can. For each time the contestant read out their new name, $100 would be given to them.

On June 27, 2013, Bell Media completed its acquisition of Astral Media, making CKFM a sister station to sports talk-formatted CHUM and Hot AC-formatted CHUM-FM. Due to CRTC ownership limits, Bell and Astral's fellow FM stations CFXJ-FM and CHBM-FM were sold to Newcap Radio (now Stingray Radio).

HD Radio
On July 4, 2017, CKFM launched HD Radio multi-casting services. The HD1 sub-channel carries the same programming as the standard analog frequency. As of mid-2018, the HD2 sub-channel carries a simulcast of sister station CFRB, the HD3 sub-channel carries a simulcast of CHUM, and the HD4 channel carries a country format branded as Pure Country.

Controversies
After Virgin posters featuring a kitchen radio poised at the edge of a TTC subway platform with the caption "give your radio a reason to live," had appeared in Toronto, Toronto Public Space Committee criticized poster ad was "in poor taste". The city's transportation department later ordered the removal of the posters. According to TTC chair Adam Giambrone, the TTC had allowed the photo for the poster to be taken at a subway station based on a request to photograph various radios on TTC platforms. Although a supervisor was on site, there was no indication on how the photos would be used in the ad.

References

External links
 99.9 Virgin Radio
 
 

Kfm
Kfm
Kfm
Virgin Radio
Radio stations established in 1947
1947 establishments in Ontario